Mitra-Varuna is a deity or dyad of deities that played a significant role in Proto-Indo-European religion and mythology. Composed of two distinct elements – Mitra and Varuna – this divine pair represented different aspects of sovereignty, with Mitra embodying reason, order, and benevolence, and Varuna symbolizing violence, darkness, and inspiration. 

The dyad was first reconstructed as such by Georges Dumézil in his essay Mitra-Varuna. The reconstruction is linked to his Trifunctional hypothesis. With each one representing the different sides of his concept of sovereignty. 

Varuna is seen as a binder and Mitra as an unbinder. It is proposed that the two roman forms of debt Mutuum-Nexum were from each one respectively, and reflective of forms of debt dating back to the Proto Indo Europeans 

Dumezil proposes an analogy with yin and yang provides a useful framework for understanding the dialectic of Mitra-Varuna. Mitra may be seen as light and Varuna as dark.

Varuna is frenzied and aggressive, a "terrible sovereign" which comes first, and Mitra is a slow majestic sovereign.

Mitra represents a sovereign under his reasoning aspect, luminous, ordered, calm, benevolent, and priestly. Varuna, on the other hand, represents a sovereign under his attacking aspect, dark, inspired, violent, terrible, and warlike. Some expressions that assimilate "this world" to Mitra and "the other world" to Varuna have been the subject of much commentary and can be understood in this context.

The concept of Mitra as brahman and Varuna as the king of the Gandharva is a particularly suggestive formula. The Gandharva normally live in a mysterious world of their own, beyond the darkness into which Indra smote the singular Gandharva for the greater good of the brahman. In Varuna's legend, the Gandharva intervene at a tragic moment to restore his failed virility with a magic herb, just as the first Luperci put an end to the sterility of the women Romulus had abducted.

Mitra-Varuna is a modern day Hindu dyad of deities They are associated with homosexuality and believed by Dumezil to descend from this original dyad.

The dyad was mentioned in a treaty by the Mitanni supporting the hypothesis of a Indo-Aryan superstrate in Mitanni.

Priesthoods 
The king as the high priest would have been the central figure in establishing favourable relations with the other world. Georges Dumézil suggested that the religious function was represented by a duality, one reflecting the magico-religious nature of priesthood, while the other is involved in religious sanction to human society (especially contracts), a theory supported by common features in Iranian, Roman, Scandinavian and Celtic traditions.

Dumezil proposes that there were two dialectical priesthoods of *bhelgh-men- (flamens/brahmins) and *guhe(n)dh-rwo-(gandarvas) 

He proposes many traits of them and their practices wuch as gandarvas being associated with horse riding and flamens prohibited from it

Romulus was associated with the Gandarvas and Numa Pompilius with the flamens. Under this both Romulus and Remus had elements of Yemo in them and Numa and Romulus had elements of Manu.

Manu and Yemo would be the first flamen and the first gandarva respectively.

Contracts 
In 1907, linguist Antoine Meillet proposed a groundbreaking theory that Mitra should be interpreted as the personification of contracts. This theory was based on linguistic and sociological evidence, and was widely accepted by scholars of the time. However, in the following years, the concept of the contract evolved, and it became clear that the notions of legal contract and emotional friendship were actually two distinct meanings, both of which were derived from an earlier, more complex concept.

The theory of Mitra as a god of contracts was also disputed by scholars who favored a naturalistic interpretation of Indo-Iranian mythology. Nonetheless, Meillet's theory remains relevant and important for the study of Indo-Iranian culture and religion.

One of the most influential interpretations of Varuna was proposed by French scholar Maurice Bloomfield, who saw Varuna as a terrifying god with the power to create and modify forms and to control the laws of nature. Bloomfield compared Varuna to the Greek god Uranus, who was also known for his tyrannical and unbridled nature.

Another important aspect of Varuna's character is his association with human sacrifice, both ritually and mythically. This aspect of his character has been the subject of much scholarly debate, with some scholars arguing that it reflects the violent and brutal nature of early Indo-Iranian societies, while others see it as a symbolic representation of the cosmic order.

In his work "Doctrine du Sacrifice," French scholar Sylvain Levi noted a passage from the Satapatha Brahmana that contrasts Mitra and Varuna as intelligence and will, decision and act, and waning and waxing moon. Levi argues that the disparity between interpretations of these passages proves that they are products of imagination, but they nevertheless provide an excellent definition of two different ways of regarding and directing the world.

Binding of evil 
Jaan Puhvel notes similarities between the Norse myth in which the god Týr inserts his hand into the wolf Fenrir's mouth while the other gods bind him with Gleipnir, only for Fenrir to bite off Týr's hand when he discovers he cannot break his bindings, and the Iranian myth in which Jamshid rescues his brother's corpse from Ahriman's bowels by reaching his hand up Ahriman's anus and pulling out his brother's corpse, only for his hand to become infected with leprosy. In both accounts, an authority figure forces the evil entity into submission by inserting his hand into the being's orifice (in Fenrir's case the mouth, in Ahriman's the anus) and losing or impairing it. Fenrir and Ahriman fulfill different roles in their own mythological traditions and are unlikely to be remnants of a Proto-Indo-European "evil god"; nonetheless, it is clear that the "binding myth" is of Proto-Indo-European origin. Georges Dumézil sees this as a common myth of Mitra, and contrasting with the Eye loss myth of Varuna.

Day and night 
Other "coupled notions" that link Mitra and Varuna in Indian religious thought include Mitra as the day and Varuna as the night, Mitra as the right and Varuna as the left (in accordance with the view of the right as the strong or just side), and Mitra taking that which has been well sacrificed to reward, while Varuna takes that which is badly sacrificed to chastise. These expressions define homologous points on the two levels of understanding that can be recognized through figures like Numa and Romulus in Roman religious thought.

In an earlier model Georges Dumézil and S. K. Senhave proposed *Worunos or *Werunos (also the eponymous god in the reconstructed dialogue The king and the god) as the nocturnal sky and benevolent counterpart of Dyēws, with possible cognates in Greek Ouranos and Vedic Varuna, from the PIE root *woru- ("to encompass, cover"). Worunos may have personified the firmament, or dwelled in the night sky. In both Greek and Vedic poetry, Ouranos and Varuna are portrayed as "wide-looking", bounding or seizing their victims, and having or being a heavenly "seat". Although many have said the etymology was untenable.  In the three-sky cosmological model, the celestial phenomena linking the nightly and daily skies is embodied by a "Binder-god": the Greek Kronos, a transitional deity between Ouranos and Zeus in Hesiod's Theogony, the Indic Savitṛ, associated with the rising and setting of the sun in the Vedas, and the Roman Saturnus, whose feast marked the period immediately preceding the winter solstice.

In the cosmological model proposed by Jean Haudry, the Proto-Indo-European sky is composed of three "heavens" (diurnal, nocturnal and liminal) rotating around an axis mundi, each having its own deities, social associations and colors (white, dark and red, respectively). Deities of the diurnal sky could not transgress the domain of the nocturnal sky, inhabited by its own sets of gods and by the spirits of the dead. For instance, Zeus cannot extend his power to the nightly sky in the Iliad. In this vision, the liminal or transitional sky embodies the gate or frontier (dawn and twilight) binding the two other heavens.

Correspondences

See Also 

 Manu and Yemo
 Janus
 Apollonian and Dionysian

References

Bibliography

 

 
 

Proto-Indo-European deities
Proto-Indo-European mythology
Justice deities